Mehbooba ("Beloved") is a 2008 Indian Hindi-language romance film written, produced and directed by Afzal Khan. The story is based on a love triangle, with the lead protagonists being Sanjay Dutt, Ajay Devgn and Manisha Koirala. The music of the film was composed by Ismail Darbar. Mehbooba was released in India on 11 July 2008; it was shot in 2000, but got delayed and released in 2008.

Plot 
The story follows a rich playboy businessman named Shravan (Sanjay Dutt). One day, he meets the beautiful and vivacious Varsha (Manisha Koirala), whom he tries to woo, and become friends with her. After a while, he proposes marriage to Varsha, to which she eventually agrees. The two get engaged and go on holiday together. However, while on holiday, Shravan tells Varsha that he faked his love for her and proposed only so that he could sleep with her. Heartbroken, Varsha leaves the country in an attempt to get away from Shravan, and begins a new life under the name of Payal. Shravan returns to his home and tells his family that things did not go well with Varsha.

Ten years later, Payal meets a man named Karan (Ajay Devgn) a young artist, who begins to follow her. He tells her that she is the woman he sees in his dreams, and they fall in love. Payal agrees to marry him and they begin wedding preparations. However, on the week of the ceremony, Shravan, who is revealed to be Karan's brother, arrives in the village. Both Shravan and Payal are shocked when they recognise the other.

Gossip about the two begins to spread, and Karan, after finding out the truth, attempts suicide. Shravan comes to Karan and confesses to him that he had been cruel to Varsha/Payal. Shravan is hurt and struggles to make Karan promise to take care of Payal, and not tell their family that Payal is Varsha. He tries to ask for forgiveness, but dies in Karan's arms.

Cast 
 Sanjay Dutt as Shravan Dhariwal
 Ajay Devgn as Karan Dhariwal
 Manisha Koirala as Varsha/Payal
 Kader Khan as Lawyer
 Sanober Kabir in song "Babuji Bahut Dukhta Ha"
 Aasif Sheikh as Shravan's Friend
 Annu Kapoor as Hari Singh 
 Asrani as 
 Mushtaq Khan as 
 Razzak Khan as 
 Himani Shivpuri as
 Reema Lagoo as Mother Shravan And Karan
 Bindu as

Box office 
Mehbooba had a good first-week response at the box office. It collected Rs. 35.45 crore in its first week. The films did business of 68 crores in India and 90.32 crores worldwide. The film is considered a failure, and was demoted as a disaster at the box office by Box Office India.

Music 
The soundtrack was composed by Ismail Darbar with lyrics by Anand Bakshi.

References

External links 
 

2000s romance films
2008 films
2000s Hindi-language films
Films set in Hungary
Films scored by Ismail Darbar
Indian romance films
Hindi-language romance films